The Forty-Eighters were Europeans who participated in or supported the Revolutions of 1848 that swept Europe. In the German Confederation, the Forty-Eighters favoured unification of Germany, a more democratic government, and guarantees of human rights. Disappointed at the failure of the revolution to bring about the reform of the system of government in Germany or the Austrian Empire and sometimes on the government's wanted list because of their involvement in the revolution, they gave up their old lives to try again abroad, emigrating to Australia, the United Kingdom, and the United States. These included Germans, Czechs, Hungarians, and others. A large number were respected, politically active, wealthy, and well-educated, and found success in their new countries.

In the Americas

Brazil
Disappointed by the failure of the Prussian Revolution in 1848, the biologist Fritz Müller realised there might be implications for his life and career. As a result, he emigrated to South Brazil in 1852, with his brother August and their wives, to join Hermann Blumenau's new colony in the State of Santa Catarina. There he studied the natural history of the Atlantic forest in that region, and wrote the book Facts and Arguments for Darwin.

Chile

After being advised by Bernhard Eunom Philippi among others, Karl Anwandter emigrated to Chile following the failed revolution. In 1850 he settled in Valdivia. He was joined there by numerous other German immigrants of the period.

United States

Germans migrated to developing midwestern and southern cities, developing the beer and wine industries in several locations, and advancing journalism; others developed thriving agricultural communities.

Galveston, Texas, was a port of entry to many Forty-Eighters. Some settled there and in Houston, but many settled in the Texas Hill Country in the vicinity of Fredericksburg. Due to their liberal ideals, they strongly opposed Texas's secession in 1861.  In the Bellville area of Austin County, another destination for Forty-Eighters, the German precincts voted decisively against the secession ordinance.

More than 30,000 Forty-Eighters settled in what became called the Over-the-Rhine neighbourhood of Cincinnati, Ohio.  There they helped define the distinct German culture of the neighbourhood, and in some cases also brought a rebellious nature with them from Germany. Cincinnati was the southern terminus of the Miami and Erie Canal, and large numbers of emigrants from modern Germany, beginning with the Forty-Eighters, followed the canal north to settle available land in western Ohio.

In the Cincinnati riot of 1853, in which one demonstrator was killed, Forty-Eighters violently protested the visit of the papal emissary Cardinal Gaetano Bedini, who had repressed revolutionaries in the Papal States in 1849. Protests took place also in 1854; Forty-Eighters were held responsible for the killing of two law enforcement officers in the two events.

Many German Forty-Eighters settled in Milwaukee, Wisconsin, helping solidify that city's progressive political bent and cultural Deutschtum. The Acht-und-vierzigers and their descendants contributed to the development of that city's long Socialist political tradition. Others settled throughout the state.

In the United States, most Forty-Eighters opposed nativism and slavery, in keeping with the liberal ideals that had led them to flee from Europe. In the Camp Jackson Affair in St. Louis, Missouri, a large force of German volunteers helped prevent Confederate forces from seizing the government arsenal just prior to the beginning of the American Civil War. About 200,000 German-born soldiers enlisted in the Union Army, ultimately forming about 10% of the North's entire armed forces; 13,000 Germans served in Union Volunteer Regiments from New York alone.

After the Civil War, Forty-Eighters supported improved labor laws and working conditions. They also advanced the country's cultural and intellectual development in such fields as education, the arts, medicine, journalism, and business.

Many were members of the Turner movement.

Notable German Forty-Eighters in the US
 Architects, engineers, scientists: Louis Burger, Adolf Cluss, Henry Flad, Charles Pfizer
 Artists: Friedrich Girsch; Wilhelm Heine; Theodore Kaufman; Louis Prang; Henry Ulke; Adelbert John Volck
 Businessmen, investment bankers: Solomon Loeb, Abraham Kuhn founders of Kuhn, Loeb & Co.
Soldiers in the American Civil War: Louis Blenker; Alexander Schimmelpfennig; Carl Schurz; Franz Sigel; Max Weber; August Willich; Peter Joseph Osterhaus; Frederick Salomon; Adolph von Steinwehr; Joseph Weydemeyer; Gustav Struve
 Journalists, writers, publishers: Mathilde Franziska Anneke; Karl Theodor Bayrhoffer; Gustav Bloede (see Marie Bloede); Henry Boernstein; Rudolf Doehn; Carl Adolph Douai; Carl Daenzer; Bernard Domschke; Christian Essellen (editor of Atlantis); Julius Fröbel; Karl Peter Heinzen; Rudolf Lexow (founder of Belletristisches Journal); Carl F. Bauer and Sigismund Löw (founders of Pittsburger Volksblatt); Niclas Müller; Reinhold Solger; Emil Praetorius; Oswald Ottendorfer; Friedrich Hassaurek; Theodor Olshausen; Hermann Raster; Wilhelm Rapp; Carl Heinrich Schnauffer; Kaspar Beetz; Carl Dilthey; F. Raine; Heinrich Börnstein; Charles L. Bernays; Emil Rothe; Eduard Leyh; George Schneider (who was also a banker); Albert Sigel; Franz Umbscheiden; Edward Morwitz (who was also a physician)
 Musicians: Charles Ansorge; Carl Bergmann; Otto Dresel; Herman Trost (band leader in Sherman's army who later settled in Lexington, Kentucky, where he conducted the first band at the University of Kentucky; friend of John Philip Sousa); Carl Zerrahn; Carl August Braun, music teacher in Philadelphia
 Physicians: Abraham Jacobi; Ferdinand Ludwig Herff; Herman Kiefer; Ernest Krackowizer; Hans Kudlich; Wilhelm Loewe, Gustav C. E. Weber William Wagner
 Poets: Konrad Krez; Edmund Märklin; Rudolf Puchner
 Political activists: Lorenz Brentano (later a member of the Congress); Friedrich Hecker; Carl Schurz (later US Secretary of the Interior); Friedrich Sorge; Gustav von Struve; Wilhelm Weitling; Rudolf Dulon; Edward Salomon; Louis F. Schade, Emil Dietzsch, Ernst Schmidt
 Other: Margarethe Schurz (founder of the first kindergarten in the U.S.); Al Sieber (known as "Chief of the Scouts" in Arizona, who fought at Antietam, Fredericksburg, and Chancellorsville with Hecker, Schurz, and Sigel, and then in the Battle of Gettysburg); Joseph Spiegel (founder of the Spiegel Catalog); Hugo Wesendonck (founder of the Germania Life Insurance Company, now The Guardian Life Insurance Company of America); Pauline Wunderlich (fought at the Dresden barricades); John Michael Maisch (father of adequate pharmaceutical legislation). George Kilgen, organ builder, saw hard service as a soldier where he was a compatriot of Gen. Franz Sigel and Carl Schurz in the revolutions of 1847–48. He was banished from his native country Germany and first located in New York City. Later he relocated his business to St. Louis.

Notable Czech Forty-Eighters in the US
Prokup Hudek, one of the "Slavonic Artillerymen" of the 24th Illinois Infantry Regiment, and one of the co-founders of the Workingmen's Party of Illinois
František Korbel, winegrower in Sonoma County, California
Vojta Náprstek, Czech language publisher in Milwaukee
Hans Balatka, Moravian musician in Milwaukee and Chicago

Notable Hungarian Forty-Eighters in the US
Alexander Asboth
Michael Heilprin
Phineas Mendel Heilprin
Martin Koszta
Lázár Mészáros
Albin Francisco Schoepf
Julius Stahel
Edward R. Straznicky
Charles Zagonyi

Notable Irish Forty-Eighters in the US
Thomas Francis Meagher
John O'Mahony
Lola Montez (she fled from Bavaria via Switzerland, France and England)

Notable French Forty-Eighters in the US
Victor Prosper Considerant (also in Belgium for a time)

Notable Polish Forty-Eighters in the US
Włodzimierz Krzyżanowski, Civil War general and engineer

In Australia

In 1848, the first non-British ship carrying immigrants to arrive in Victoria was from Germany; the Goddefroy, on 13 February. Many of those on board were political refugees. Some Germans also travelled to Australia via London. In April 1849, the Beulah was the first ship to bring assisted German vinedresser families to New South Wales. The second ship, the Parland, left London on 13 March 1849, and arrived in Sydney on 5 July 1849.

The Princess Louise left Hamburg 26 March 1849, in the spring, bound for South Australia via Rio de Janeiro. The voyage took 135 days, which was considered slow, but nevertheless the Princess Louise berthed at Port Adelaide on 7 August 1849, with 161 emigres, including Johann Friedrich Mosel. Johann, born in 1827 in Berlin in the duchy of Brandenburg, had taken three weeks to travel from his home to the departure point of the 350-tonne vessel at Hamburg. This voyage had been well planned by two of the founding passengers, brothers Richard and Otto Schomburgk, who had been implicated in the revolution. Otto had been jailed in 1847 for his activities as a student revolutionary. The brothers, along with others including Frau von Kreussler and D. Meucke, formed a migration group, the South Australian Colonisation Society, one of many similar groups forming throughout Germany at the time. Sponsored by  geologist Leopold von Buch, the society chartered the Princess Louise to sail to South Australia. The passengers were mainly middle-class professionals, academics, musicians, artists, architects, engineers, artisans, and apprentices, and were among the core of liberal radicals, disillusioned with events in Germany.

Many Germans became vintners or worked in the wine industry; others founded Lutheran churches. By 1860, for example, about 70 German families lived in Germantown, Victoria. (When World War I broke out, the town was renamed Grovedale.) In Adelaide, a German Club was founded in 1854, which played a major role in society.

Notable Australian Forty-Eighters
Carl Linger, the conductor and composer who wrote the tune for Caroline Carleton's "The Song of Australia"
 Moritz Richard Schomburgk, later director of the Adelaide Botanical Gardens
Hermann Büring, in the wine industry
Friedrich Krichauff, chairman of the Agricultural Bureau

In Europe

Belgium
 Louis Blanc
 Victor Prosper Considerant

France
Ludwig Bamberger settled in Paris and worked in a bank from 1852 until the amnesty of 1866 allowed him to return to Germany. Carl Schurz was in France for a time before moving to England. He stayed there with Adolf Strodtmann. Anton Heinrich Springer visited France.

Netherlands
Ludwig Bamberger was in the Netherlands for a time, as were Heinrich Bernhard Oppenheim and Anton Heinrich Springer.

Switzerland
The following were all refugees from Germany:
 Friedrich Beust settled in Switzerland to work in early-childhood education.  He lived and worked there until his death in 1899.
 Albert Dulk, a dramatist, settled in Geneva after touring the Orient.  He eventually returned to Germany.
 Gottfried Kinkel moved to Switzerland in 1866 after living in England.  He was a professor of archaeology and the history of art at the Polytechnikum in Zürich, where he died 16 years later.
 Hermann Köchly first fled to Brussels in 1849. In 1851, he was appointed professor of classical philology at the University of Zürich. By 1864, he was back in Germany as a professor at the University of Heidelberg.
 Johannes Scherr, novelist and literary critic, fled to Switzerland and eventually became a professor at the Polytechnikum in Zurich.
 Richard Wagner, the composer, first fled to Paris and then settled in Zurich. He eventually returned to Germany.

United Kingdom

In the early years after the failure of the revolutions of 1848, a group of German Forty-Eighters and others met in a salon organized by Baroness Méry von Bruiningk and her husband Ludolf August von Bruiningk in St. John's Wood, then a suburb of London.  The baroness was a Russian of German descent who was sympathetic with the goals of the revolutionaries. Guests included Carl Schurz, Gottfried and Johanna Kinkel, Ferdinand Freiligrath, Alexander Herzen, Louis Blanc, Malwida von Meysenbug, Adolf Strodtmann, Johannes and Bertha Ronge, Alexander Schimmelfennig, Wilhelm Loewe-Kalbe and Heinrich Bernhard Oppenheim.

Carl Schurz wrote in his memoir about this time: 
"A large number of refugees from almost all parts of the European continent had gathered in London since the year 1848, but the intercourse between the different national groups – Germans, Frenchmen, Italians, Hungarians, Poles, Russians – was confined more or less to the prominent personages. All, however, in common nourished the confident hope of a revolutionary upturning on the continent soon to come. Among the Germans there were only a few who shared this hope in a less degree. Perhaps the ablest and most important person among these was Lothar Bucher, a quiet, retiring man of great capacity and acquirements, who occupied himself with serious political studies."

Other Germans who fled to the United Kingdom for a time were Ludwig Bamberger,
Arnold Ruge, Alexandre Ledru-Rollin and Franz Sigel. Along with several of the above, Sabine Freitag also lists Gustav Adolf Techow, Eduard Meyen, Graf Oskar von Reichenbach, Josef Fickler and Amand Goegg. Karl Blind became a writer in Great Britain. Bohemian Anton Heinrich Springer was in England for a time during his years of exile.

Hungarian refugee Gustav Zerffi became a British citizen and worked as a historian in London. Lajos Kossuth, a Hungarian revolutionary, toured England & Scotland and then the United States. He returned to Great Britain, where he formed a government in exile.

French refugees Louis Blanc, Pierre Leroux, and Louis-Nicolas Ménard found relief in Great Britain for a time.

Italian Giuseppe Mazzini used London as a place of refuge before and after the revolutions of 1848.

Heligoland
In addition, the British possession of Heligoland was a destination for refugees, for example Rudolf Dulon.

Jersey
 Pierre Leroux

Wandering Forty-Eighters
Karl Hermann Berendt, a German physician, emigrated to the United States and spent his time there and in Mesoamerica investigating Mayan linguistics
Ferenc Pulszky, a Hungarian politician, who joined Kossuth on his tour of England and the United States, became involved in Italian revolutionary activities and was imprisoned, and then was pardoned and returned home in 1866

See also
German American
German Australian
Canadians of German descent
Nueces massacre
German Mexicans

References

Bibliography
 Lattek, Christine. Revolutionary refugees: German socialism in Britain, 1840–1860, Routledge, 2006.
 Wittke, Carl. Refugees of Revolution: The German Forty-Eighters in America, Philadelphia:  Univ. of Penn. Press, 1952. at archive.org
 Wittke, Carl. "The German forty-eighters in America: a centennial appraisal." American Historical Review 53.4 (1948): 711-725. online

 Daniel Nagel, Von republikanischen Deutschen zu deutsch-amerikanischen Republikanern. Ein Beitrag zum Identitätswandel der deutschen Achtundvierziger in den Vereinigten Staaten 1850–1861. Röhrig: St. Ingbert, 2012.

External links 
 

 
History of Australia (1851–1900)
1848 in Germany
Czech diaspora
Czech-American history
German diaspora
German-American history
Hungarian diaspora
Hungarian-American history
1848 in Europe
German-Australian culture